CnaG is an abbreviation for two separate Gaelic organisations:
Cumann na nGaedheal ("Society of the Gaels") - an historic political party in Ireland
Comunn na Gàidhlig ("The Gaelic language Society") - an organisation which seeks to promote Scottish Gaelic language and culture